The 1942 Connecticut gubernatorial election was held on November 3, 1942. It was a rematch of the 1940 Connecticut gubernatorial election. Republican nominee Raymond E. Baldwin defeated Democratic incumbent Robert A. Hurley with 48.93% of the vote.

General election

Candidates
Major party candidates
Raymond E. Baldwin, Republican
Robert A. Hurley, Democratic

Other candidates
Jasper McLevy, Socialist
Joseph C. Borden Jr., Socialist Labor

Results

References

1942
Connecticut
Gubernatorial